Pietracorbara is a commune in the Haute-Corse department of France on the island of Corsica.
It takes its name from the Pietracorbara stream.

Population

See also
 Tour de Castellare
Communes of the Haute-Corse department

References

External links
 Official website 
 A website built by the Petra Viva association 

Communes of Haute-Corse